A rebetis (Greek: ρεμπέτης ; pl. rebetes ρεμπέτες ) is a musician involved in the scene of the Greek musical genre of rebetiko, which flourished between 1920 and 1955.

Prominent rebetes include:
Rita Abatzi
Babis Tsertos
Yiorgos Batis
Sotiria Bellou
Anestis Delias
Roza Eskenazi
Mihalis Genitsaris
Dimitris Gogos (Bayianderas)
Giannis Eitziridis (Yovan Tsaous)
Apostolos Hatzichristos
Manolis Hiotis
Manolis Chrysafakis
Anna Chrysafi
Apostolos Nikolaidis
Marika Ninou
Giannis Papaioannou
Vangelis Papazoglou
Stratos Pagioumtzis
Stelios Perpiniadis (Stellakis)
Kostas Roukounas
Kostas Skarvelis
Prodromos Tsaousakis
Vassilis Tsitsanis
Markos Vamvakaris (Markos)
Kostas Kaplanis
Andonis Kalyvopoulos
A. Kostis
Antonis Dalgas
Giorgos Theologitis (Katsaros)
Stelios Keromytis
Giorgos Mouflouzelis
Giorgos Kavouaras
Odysseas Moshonas

Note: Sometimes (not without controversy) this definition is extended to include modern day performers of this kind of music, such as Babis Goles and Agathonas Iakovidis.

Sources 
Damianakos Stathis, Κοινωνιολογία του Ρεμπέτικου 2nd Edition. Athens, Plethron, 2001.
Gauntlett Stathis, Rebetika, Carmina Graeciae Recentoris. Athens, D. Harvey and Co., 1985.
Hadjidakis Manos, Ερμηνεία και θέση του ρεμπέτικου τραγουδιού. 1949.
Holst-Warhaft Gail, Road to Rembetika: Music of a Greek sub-culture, songs of love, sorrow and hashish, Athens, Denise Harvey, 1989
Kotarides Nikos, Ρεμπέτες και ρεμπέτικο τραγούδι. Athens, Plethron, 1996.
Kounades Panagiotis, Εις ανάμνησιν στιγμών ελκυστικών. Athens, Katarti, 2000.
Petropoulos Elias, Ρεμπέτικα τραγούδια. Athens, 1968.

Greek music
Rebetiko
 
Musical subcultures